Sir Philip Broke (1776–1841) was a Royal Navy officer, captain of HMS Shannon when she defeated USS Chesapeake.

Philip Broke may also refer to:
Philip Broke (Ipswich MP) (1702–1762), English politician
Sir Philip Broke, 2nd Baronet (1804–1855), Royal Navy officer, of the Broke-Middleton baronets

See also
Broke (disambiguation)